Roxboro Cotton Mill is a historic cotton mill complex located at Roxboro, Person County, North Carolina.  It was built in 1899, and is a two-story, banked, textile mill with Italianate-style influence and slow-burning heavy timber frame construction. An addition to the original mill building was built in 1924, and together they measure approximately 525 feet long (68 bays).  The building housed the spinning and carding operations. The mill remained in operation until 1999.

It was added to the National Register of Historic Places in 2009.

References

1899 establishments in North Carolina
Industrial buildings and structures on the National Register of Historic Places in North Carolina
Italianate architecture in North Carolina
Industrial buildings completed in 1899
Buildings and structures in Person County, North Carolina
National Register of Historic Places in Person County, North Carolina